Bent Creek is an unincorporated community in Appomattox County, Virginia, United States.

References

GNIS reference

Unincorporated communities in Appomattox County, Virginia